An election for the Tobago House of Assembly (THA) was held on January 19, 2009. The PNM won 8 seats and obtained 61.42% of the votes while the TOP won 4 seats and 48.32% of the votes.

Candidates

People's National Movement 

 Orville London – Scarborough / Calder Hall
 Carl Alleyne – Bacolet / Mount Saint George
 Wendell Berkley – Goodwood / Belle Gardens
 Hilton Sandy – Roxborough / Delaford
 Tracey Davidson-Celestine – Parlatuvier / L'anse Fourmi / Speyside
 Nathisha Charles Pantin – Providence / Mason Hall / Moriah
 Claudia Groome Duke – Black Rock / Whim / Spring Garden
 Godwin Adams – Plymouth / Golden Lane
 Whitney Alfred – Bethel / Mount Irvine
 Albert Pilgrim – Buccoo / Mount Pleasant
 Frank Roberts – Canaan / Bon Accord
 Oswald Williams – Lambeau / Signal Hill

Tobago Organisation of the People 

 Anthony Arnold – Scarborough / Calder Hall
 Orville Jordan – Bacolet / Mount Saint George
 Steve Jack – Goodwood / Belle Gardens
 Lenn Toppin – Roxborough / Delaford
 Fitzherbert Taylor – Parlatuvier / L'anse Fourmi / Speyside
 Ashworth Jack – Providence / Mason Hall / Moriah
 Yvetter Parks Caruth – Black Rock / Whim / Spring Garden
 Trevor Armstrong – Plymouth / Golden Lane
 Terrence Baynes – Bethel / Mount Irvine
 Donna Parks Greene – Buccoo / Mount Pleasant
 Rolly Quaccoo – Canaan / Bon Accord
 Harrisford McMillan – Lambeau / Signal Hill

Independent 

 Andre Phillips – Bacolet / Mt St George

Results

References 

Tobago
2009
2009 in Trinidad and Tobago